Tolosa may refer to:

Places 
Tolosa, the name of Toulouse, France, in Occitan, Basque, Catalan, Spanish, Italian and Latin
Tolosa, Buenos Aires, a neighborhood of La Plata, Buenos Aires province, Argentina
Tolosa, Leyte, a municipality in the Philippines
Tolosa, Portugal, a parish of Nisa, Portugal
Tolosa, Gipuzkoa, a town and municipality in Basque Country, Spain
Tolosa, Texas, an unincorporated community in Kaufman County, United States
Visigothic Kingdom of Tolosa, a kingdom in southwestern France and the Iberian Peninsula (418-507 A.D.)

People 
Ambesse Tolosa (born 1977), Ethiopian long-distance runner who specializes in the marathon
Eugenio Tolosa, a 19th-century brigadier general in the Mexican army, see timeline of the Texas Revolution
Joyos de Tolosa (probably 13th century), troubadour from Toulouse
Juan de Tolosa (fl. 16th century), Spanish Basque conquistador
Juan Carlos Tolosa (born 1966), Argentinian composer, pianist and conductor
Peire Guillem de Tolosa, 13th-century troubadour from Toulouse
Peire Raimon de Tolosa (fl. 12th-century–13th-century), troubadour from Toulouse

Other 
138 Tolosa, an asteroid
 a number of ships with this name
Tolosa mountain, a 5432 m high peak in the Andes next to the Aconcagua

See also
Tolosa–Hunt syndrome, a rare medical disorder
Gold of Tolosa, a hoard of "cursed" treasures pillaged from Greece and left in the Tolosa lakes